is a railway station of Chūō Main Line, East Japan Railway Company (JR East) in Shimoimai, in the city of Kai, Yamanashi Prefecture, Japan.

Lines

Layout
Shiozaki Station has two elevated opposed side platforms, which were on an embankment at a higher level than the station building, and which were not connected by an overpass or level crossing. Changing platforms required leaving the station and crossing a public road and reentering. In 2014, the city of Kai and JR East built a new station building which eliminated the height difference, making it a barrier-free station. The station is staffed.

Platforms

History
Shiozaki Station opened on December 15, 1951 as a passenger station on the JNR (Japanese National Railways). With the dissolution and privatization of the JNR on April 1, 1987, the station came under the control of the East Japan Railway Company.  Automated turnstiles using the Suica IC Card system came into operation from October 16, 2004. A new station building was completed in 2014.。

Passenger statistics
In fiscal 2017, the station was used by an average of 1,120 passengers daily (boarding passengers only).

Surrounding area
Nihon Koku High School

See also
 List of railway stations in Japan

References
 Miyoshi Kozo. Chuo-sen Machi to eki Hyaku-niju nen. JT Publishing (2009)

External links

JR East Shiozaki Station

Railway stations in Yamanashi Prefecture
Railway stations in Japan opened in 1951
Chūō Main Line
Stations of East Japan Railway Company
Kai, Yamanashi